Mountain of Piss is the 11th studio album by Australian punk rock band Cosmic Psychos, released on 9 July 2021 through Go the Hack Records. The album peaked at No. 19 on the Australian charts, their highest ranking.

Recording
The album was recorded in the shed on lead singer Knight's property in Mia Mia, Victoria. Mostly recorded in October 2019, there was some further work done in 2020.

The album release was delayed due to the COVID-19 pandemic. Knight said, "Instead of releasing the album, I had two hip replacements. I'm told they are titanium, but being the public health system, they may be made from balsa wood for all I know."

Reception
The Canberra Times said, "It's another collection of crunching grunge guitar over Ross Knight's gravelly, yet witty, roar about everything from stupid sports stars ("Sin Bin"), dodgy accountants, and a humorous lament about the changing nature of Australian society ("Too Old To Drink In Pubs"). The best moments arrive when The Psychos turn up the distortion and jam." Loud agreed, "Bare bones brute force, unrestrained and loud: the raucous simplicity of the Psychos' brand of punk rock never wavers, even as they take slight artistic variations."

Wall of Sound said, "One thing that I don't like in this world is when your favourite band become a bunch of old, fat blokes, completely out of touch, and trying to relive past glories but are nowhere near up to the task. Then you have the Cosmic Psychos."

The Courier-Mail noted, "they’ve lost none of that yobbo sensibility. Drinking and toilet songs lower the tone."

Track listing
"Accountant Song" – 3:53
"Beep" – 2:22
"Bleeding Knuckles" – 3:18
"Dickson" – 2:31
"Dunny Seat" – 3:48
"Mountain of Piss" – 3:46
"Munted" – 3:56
"Rude Man" – 2:55
"Sin Bin" – 2:51
"Too Old to Drink in Pubs" – 4:01
"Unreal" – 2:29
"Dumb" (digital bonus track) – 4:12

Personnel
 Ross Knight – lead vocals, bass guitar
 John McKeering – guitar, backing vocals, lead vocals on "Dickson"
 Dean Muller – drums, backing vocals

Charts

References

2021 albums
Cosmic Psychos albums